The 2019 Revline Toruń FIM Speedway Grand Prix of Poland was the tenth and final race of the 2019 Speedway Grand Prix season. It took place on October 5 at the Marian Rose MotoArena in Toruń, Poland.

Riders 
First reserve Robert Lambert replaced Greg Hancock. The Speedway Grand Prix Commission nominated Adrian Miedziński as the wild card, and Jakub Miśkowiak and Karol Żupiński both as Track Reserves.

Results 
The Grand Prix was won by Leon Madsen, who beat Emil Sayfutdinov, Niels-Kristian Iversen and Bartosz Zmarzlik in the final. It was the third win Grand Prix win of Madsen's career, and his second in a row after winning the 2019 Speedway Grand Prix of Great Britain.

Despite scoring a maximum 21 points, Madsen could not overhaul Zmarzlik in the race for the world title - losing out by just two points. Zmarzlik was crowned world champion, becoming the first Polish rider to win the title since Tomasz Gollob in 2010 Speedway Grand Prix

Sayfutdinov and Madsen both closed in on overall leader Zmarzlik by claiming 17 points, however the Pole's third place meant he took a nine-point lead into the final round of the year in Toruń (see intermediate classification table below).

Heat details

Final classification

References 

Poland 3
Speedway Grand Prix
Grand
Speedway Grand Prix of Poland